Staurocalyptus is a genus of sponge. It was circumscribed in 1897 by Isao Ijima.

Taxonomy

Ijima circumscribed Staurocalyptus as a genus in the family Rossellidae. His initial taxonomy included three newly described species and two transferred from Rhabdocalyptus. Ijimi did not designate a type species; in 1967 V. M. Koltun designated Rhabdocalyptus dowlingi  as the type species. A 2002 revision of Rossellidae by K. R. Tabachnick demoted Staurocalyptus to be a subgenus of Acanthascus and designated a new type species: Staurocalyptus glaber . However, WoRMS still classifies Staurocalyptus as a genus and follows Koltun's type species designation, not that of Tabachnick.

Distribution

Species
, WoRMS recognizes the following seventeen species:
 Staurocalyptus affinis 
 Staurocalyptus celebesianus 
 Staurocalyptus dowlingi 
 Staurocalyptus entacanthus 
 Staurocalyptus fasciculatus 
 Staurocalyptus fuca 
 Staurocalyptus glaber 
 Staurocalyptus hamatus 
 Staurocalyptus heteractinus 
 Staurocalyptus microchetus 
 Staurocalyptus pleorhaphides 
 Staurocalyptus psilosus 
 Staurocalyptus roeperi 
 Staurocalyptus rugocruciatus 
 Staurocalyptus solidus 
 Staurocalyptus tubulosus 
 Staurocalyptus tylotus

References

Further reading

 
 

 
 

Hexactinellida
Sponge genera